On 7 April 2013, a Mil Mi-8 helicopter operated by Helicópteros del Pacífico (Helipac) broke up in flight and crashed en route from Iquitos to a Perenco site near the Curaray River, in the Loreto Region of Peru. All 13 people on board were killed. The occupants, all Peruvian nationals, were nine passengers and four crew. Among the passengers were Perenco workers and other contractors.

Investigation

The crew then attempted an emergency landing by performing an autorotation, but likely over-control by the pilot while flaring over densely forested terrain resulted in the main rotor's blades striking the tail boom, severing it from the fuselage. The aircraft then crashed to the ground out of control.

References

External links
 Accident description at the Aviation Safety Network

Aviation accidents and incidents in 2013
Accidents and incidents involving the Mil Mi-8
Aviation accidents and incidents in Peru
2013 in Peru
April 2013 events in South America
2013 disasters in Peru